The 2009–10 Primera División season is the 91st of Costa Rica's top-flight professional football league. The season began on July 25 and ended on May 16. The season was divided into two championships: the Invierno and the Verano

Format
The format for both championships are similar. Each championship will have two stages: a first "regular" stage and a second "playoff" stage. Prior to the start of the season, the twelve teams were designated into groups based on their positions in the 2008-09 aggregate table. The teams that finished 1, 4, 5, 8, 9, and Liga de Ascenso winner were placed into Group A. The teams that finished in 2, 3, 6, 7, 10, and 11 were placed into Group B.

The first stage was divided into two rounds: the first round for each championship had a single round-robin format; the second round for championship is different. The second round in the Invierno had the teams in each group play against each in a single round-robin format. The second round for the Verano will have the teams from each group play the teams in the other group in a single round-robin format. The top three teams from each group at the end of the stage will advance the second stage.

The second stage for each championship is identical: The teams that finishes 2 & 3 in their groups will play against the opposite seed from the other group over two legs. The winner of that tie will advance to the semifinals and play against one of the top teams from the groups. The winners of that tie will advance to the finals, which will determine the tournament champion.

Team information

Campeonato de Invierno
The 2009 Campeonato de Invierno, officially the 2009 Campeonato de Invierno Scotiabank for sponsorship reasons, was the first tournament of the season. The tournament began on July 25, 2009, and ended on December 28, 2009.

First stage

Standings

Results

Playoffs

Campeonato de Verano
The 2010 Campeonato de Verano, officially the 2010 Campeonato de Verano Scotiabank for sponsorship reasons, was the second tournament of the season. The tournament began on January 17, 2010, and ended on May 2, 2010.

First stage

Standings

Results

Playoffs

Aggregate table

External links
UNAFUT's official website 

Liga FPD seasons
1
Costa